Hinduism is an ancient religion Shaivism, Vaishnavism, Shaktism and others. Each tradition has a long list of Hindu texts, with subgenre based on syncretization of ideas from Samkhya, Nyaya, Yoga, Vedanta and other schools of Hindu philosophy. Of these some called Sruti are broadly considered as core scriptures of Hinduism, but beyond the Sruti, the list of scriptures vary by the scholar.

Several lists include only the Vedas, the Principal Upanishads, the Agamas and the Bhagavad Gita as scriptures broadly accepted by Hindus. Goodall adds regional texts such as Bhagavata Purana and Yajnavalkya Smriti to the list. Beyond the Sruti, Hindu texts include Smritis, Shastras, Sutras, Tantras, Puranas, Itihasas, Stotras, Subhashitas and others.

Most of these texts exist in Sanskrit, several others have been composed in other Indic languages. In modern times, most have been translated into other Indian languages and some in Western languages. This list includes major Hindu texts, along with the Hindu scriptures.

A
Aathichoodi: – an important Tamil scripture sung and written by last great saivite saint Avvaiyar.
Abhang devotional poetry requires authentication

Agama: Collection of several Jain literature and scriptures of Hindu devotional schools.
Amrutanubhav: Composition by the Marathi saint and poet Jñāneśvar
: Part of the Vedas, the third layer embedded inside them.
Arthashastra: Ancient treatise on statecraft, economic policy and military strategy written by Chanakya (Vishnugupta).
Āryabhaṭīya: An ancient Sanskrit astronomical treatise by Indian mathematician Aryabhata
Arya-sidhanta: Work on astronomical computations, by ancient mathematicians Aryabhata, Varāhamihira, Brahmagupta and Bhāskara I.
Akilathirattu Ammanai:  A 19th century Tamil Vaishnavite text and the primary scripture of Ayyavazhi sect. 
Ashtavakra Gita: text of conversation between Ashtavakra and King Janaka.

B

Baudhayana sutras: Vedic Sanskrit texts covering dharma, daily ritual, mathematics.
: The national gospel contained in Mahābhārata, Part of the epic poem Mahabharata, located in the Bhishma-Parva chapters 23–40. A core sacred text of Hinduism and philosophy.
Bhagavata Purana: one of the "Maha" Puranic texts of Hindu literature, and is Sanskrit for "The Book of God".
Bharude, Ovya: devotional poetry.
Bhavarth Ramayan: Marathi version of the Ramayana written by Sant Eknath in the 16th century
Bījagaṇita: Ancient Indian mathematics, algebra textbook by Indian mathematician Bhāskara II
Brahmana: one of the parts into which the Vedas are divided, and are its second layer.
Brahmasphuṭasiddhanta: written by ancient mathematician Brahmagupta in which hindu number system, zero, Brahmagupta's Bijganit, algebra with arithmetic is mentioned.
Brihat Samhita: An encyclopedic work by Varāhamihira on architecture, temples, planetary motions, eclipses, timekeeping, astrology, seasons, cloud formation, rainfall, agriculture, mathematics, gemology, perfumes and many other topics.

C
Classics of Indian Mathematics: Algebra, with Arithmetic and Mensuration, from the Sanskrit of Brahmagupta and Bhāskara.
Chanakyaniti: collection of aphorisms, said to be selected by Chanakya from the various shastras

D
Dasbodh: 16th century devotional and spiritual text by the saint Samarth Ramdas
Devi Bhagavata Purana
Dharmaśāstra: Sanskrit theological texts
Divya Prabandha – Collection of 4000 verses in Tamil; sung by Alvars saints on Vishnu.
Dnyaneshwari -(Marathi: ज्ञानेश्वरी) (IAST:'Jñānēśvarī) is a commentary on the Bhagavad Gita written by the Marathi saint and poet Dnyaneshwar in the 13th century.

G
Gunamala (Assamese: গুণমালা) is a scripture written by 15th–16th century Assamese polymath: a saint-scholar, poet, playwright, social-religious reformer Sankardev within one night at the request of Koch king Nara Narayan in 1552.

H
Hatha Yoga Pradipika: is one of the fundamental text of Hatha Yoga including information about asanas, pranayama, chakras, kundalini, bandhas, kriyas, shakti, nadis and mudras. It was written by Swami Swatmarama in the 15th century CE.
Haripath: is a collection of twenty-eight abhanga (poems) revealed to the thirteenth-century Marathi Saint, Dnyaneshwar.

I
Itihasas – meaning history. In Hindu religious context this term refers to the Mahabharata and the Ramayana because writer of the story has themselves witnessed the stories of both epics.

K

Kamba Ramayanam: 12th century Tamil version of Ramayana, by the Tamil poet Kambar 
Khaṇḍakhādyaka (meaning "edible bite; morsel of food") is an astronomical treatise written by Indian mathematician and astronomer Brahmagupta in 665 A.D.
Kirtan Ghosha (কীৰ্ত্তন) It a collection of poetical works, primarily composed by the medieval saint Srimanta Sankardev meant for community singing in the Ekasarana religion.
Kumārasambhava: epic poem about the birth of Kumara (Kārtikeya), the son of Shiva and Parvati, by classical Sanskrit author, playwright and dramatist Kālidāsa.

L
Lilavati: book on including maths and algebra written by Indian mathematician Bhāskara II in 1150
Lal kitab

M
Malla Purana: An ancient text on Malla-yuddha, an ancient form of Indian combat wrestling, which describes techniques of wrestling, types of exercises etc.
Meghadūta: Poem by Classical Sanskrit author, playwright and dramatist Kālidāsa.
Mahatmyam: Hindu religious text, part of the Markandeya Purana

N
Naam Ghosa (Assamese: নামঘোষা) is a Vaishnavite scripture of verses in praise of Lord Krishna. This book was written by Madhabdev in Assamese in about 1568–1596.
Naalayira Divya Prabhandham (Tamil: நாலாயிர திவ்ய பிரபந்தம்) is a collection of 4,000 Tamil verses (Naalayira in Tamil means 'four thousand') composed before 8th century AD,[1] by the 12 Alvars, and was compiled in its present form by Nathamuni during the 9th – 10th centuries. The work is the beginning of the canonization of the 12 Vaishnava poet saints, and these hymns are still sung extensively even today. The works were lost before they were collected and organized in the form of an anthology by Nathamuni.
Natyashastra: Sanskrit treatise on the performing arts, attributed to ancient Indian theatrologist and musicologist sage Bharata Muni. It consists of 36 chapters with a cumulative total of 6000 poetic verses describing performance arts.

P

Purana: Purana meaning "ancient" or "old" is the name of a genre (or a group of related genres) of Indian written literature (as distinct from oral literature). Its general themes are history, tradition and religion. It is usually written in the form of stories related by one person to another.
Periya Puranam: The Periya Puranam (Tamil: பெரிய‌ புராண‌ம்), that is, the great puranam or epic, sometimes called Tiruttontarpuranam ("Tiru-Thondar-Puranam", the Purana of the Holy Devotees), is a Tamil poetic account depicting the legendary lives of the sixty-three Nayanars, the canonical poets of Tamil Shaivism. It was compiled during the 12th century by Sekkizhar. It provides evidence of trade with South Indian. The Periya Puranam is part of the corpus of Shaiva canonical works.
Parasurama Kalpasutra: Parashurama Kalpasutra is authored by Parasurama, the fifth avatar of Lord Vishnu and a disciple of Guru Dattatreya. It is a sacred text for the Shri Vidya worshippers of Goddess Lalita Devi, who is considered to be a manifestation of the Divine Mother (Shakti), and the text is therefore used in the worship of Ganesha, Bala Tripurasundari, Raja Shyamala, Varahi as well. This text has its origins in the Dattatreya Samhita and is compiled by Sumedha, a disciple of Guru Dattatreya.

R

Ramcharitmanas (रामचरितमानस): An Awadhi rendering of Ramayana by 16th century saint and poet Tulsidas.
Raghuvaṃśa (रघुवंश): Sanskrit Mahakavya (epic poem) about the kings of the Raghu dynasty, by the most celebrated Sanskrit poet Kālidāsa

S
Samhita: one of the most important and first layer of Vedas. Also, some samhitas are independent.
Sahasranama – a book containing a list of names of deities
Shakuntala (अभिज्ञानशाकुन्तलम्): Sanskrit play dramatizing the story of Shakuntala told in the epic Mahabharata, by the ancient Indian poet Kālidāsa
Shiva Sutras of Vasugupta – a collection of seventy seven aphorisms that form the foundation of Kashmir Shaivism, attributed to the sage Vasugupta of the 9th century C.E.
Siddhānta Śiromani : It is the major treatise of Indian mathematician Bhāskara II.
Smriti – Hindu scriptures other than the Vedas (e.g. the Itihasas, the Puranas)
Sri Guru Charitra: Book based on the life story of Indian guru of Dattatreya tradition (sampradaya) Shri Narasimha Saraswati, written by the 15th-16th century poet Shri Saraswati Gangadhar
Sri Gurulilamrut: Book of Dattatreya Guru and his avatars Sripadvallabh, Shri Narasimha Saraswati and Swami Samarth.
Sri Navnath Bhaktisar: The "Navnath Bhaktisar" also known as the"Navnath pothi" narrates the Navnaths' births, their lives and deeds.
: A canon of Hindu scriptures. Shruti is believed to have no author; rather a divine recording of the "cosmic sounds of truth", heard by rishis.
: Sūtra refers to an aphorism or a collection of such aphorisms in the form of a book or text. 'Sutras' form a school of Vedic study, related to and somewhat later than the Upanishads.
Swara yoga: An ancient science of pranic body rhythms. It explores how prana can be controlled through the breath.
Sukratniti: An ancient Shilpa Shastras on Murti or Vigraha making (icon design).

T

Tantras: The esoteric Hindu traditions of rituals and yoga. Tantra can be summarised as a family of voluntary rituals modeled on those of the Vedas, together with their attendant texts and lineages.
Thirumurai – an important Tamil twelve volumes compendium which consists of Ancient Tamil Saivite works.
Thiruvasagam –one of the most important Tamil Saivite scripture sung by the great saint 'Manikavasagar'. This work was written by God Siva himself.
Tirukovai – an important Tamil Saivite scripture sung by Manikkavacakar and again written by God Shiva himself.
Thevaram – An important Tamil Saivite scripture and devotional poetry.
Thiruvilaiyadal Puranam – an important Tamil Saivite scripture written by Paranjyothi munivar which describes the 64 divine plays of God Siva in "Madurai" as "Sokkanadhar" (spouse of Goddess Meenakshi).
Tirukkural – an important Tamil scripture in Tamil Nadu written by Tamil poet and philosopher Thiruvalluvar.
Tirumantiram – an important Tamil Saivite work of religious poetry that written by last great siddha-saint Tirumular.
Thiruvarutpa – an important Tamil Saivite scripture written by last great siddha-saint Vallalar (Ramalinga Swamigal).
Thiruppugazh – an important Tamil Saivite scripture written by last great siddha-saint Arunagirinathar.

U

Upanishad: Part of the Hindu Śruti scriptures which primarily discuss meditation and philosophy, called the "scriptures par excellence" of Hinduism.
Upaveda: minor Vedas.
Upapurana: minor Puranas

V
Vasishtha Samhita: Yoga text, one of the first to describe non-seated hatha yoga asanas ascribed to the sage Vasishtha.
Veda: Vedas are texts without start and end, stated Swami Vivekananda, and they include "the accumulated treasury of spiritual laws discovered by different persons in different times." Collectively refers to a corpus of ancient Indian religious literature that are considered by adherents of Hinduism to be  (that which is heard).
Venvaroha: Mathematical and astrological work by Mādhava (c.1350 – c.1425) of Sangamagrāma  the founder of the Kerala school of astronomy and mathematics.
Vedanga: limbs of the Veda.

Y
Yoga Sutra: One of the six darshanas of Hindu or Vedic schools and, alongside the Bhagavad Gita and Hatha Yoga Pradipika, are a milestone in the history of Yoga, compiled sometime between 500 BCE and 400 CE by the sage Patanjali
Yoga Vasistha, the discourse of sage Vasistha to prince Rama. It is an important text of Yoga as well as Advaita Vedanta. The book consists of around thirty thousand slokas as well as numerous short stories and anecdotes.
Yoga Yajnavalkya: a classical treatise on yoga traditionally attributed to sage Yajnavalkya.
Yuktibhāṣā also known as Gaṇitanyāyasaṅgraha (Compendium of Astronomical Rationale), is a major treatise on mathematics and astronomy, written by the Indian astronomer Jyesthadeva of the Kerala school of mathematics around 1530.

See also
Timeline of Hindu texts

References

Bibliography
 
 

Texts
Indian literature
Literature lists
Religious bibliographies
Indian literature-related lists